Meghan Jaedick (born 23 April 1997) is a German female canoeist who a three medal at senior level at the Wildwater Canoeing World Championships.

Medals at the World Championships
Senior

References

External links
  

1997 births
Living people
German female canoeists
Place of birth missing (living people)
21st-century German women